Fort Victoria may refer to:

 Fort Victoria, Alberta, Canada
 Fort Victoria (British Columbia), Canada
 Fort Victoria (Isle of Wight), England
 Fort Victoria, Bermuda, a now disused British Army fort
 Masvingo, Zimbabwe, named Fort Victoria until 1982
 Fort Victoria, a gun emplacement on Mount Victoria, Auckland, New Zealand during the late 19th century
 Fort Victoria, capital of the Dutch Governorate of Ambon
 In the 19th century Bankot fort, near Suvarnadurg, was known for a time as Fort Victoria.

See also
 RFA Fort Victoria (A387), a 1990 Royal Fleet Auxiliary ship
 , a Furness Withy ship